"Calling Occupants of Interplanetary Craft" is a power ballad by Canadian rock band Klaatu, originally released in 1976 on their first album 3:47 EST. The song opened night transmission of the pirate radio station Radio Caroline. The year following its release, American soft rock duo the Carpenters covered the song, using a crew of 160 musicians. The Carpenters' version reached the top 10 in the UK and Canada, and charted at number 1 in Ireland.

Origin
John Woloschuk, a member of Klaatu and one of the song's composers, said:

Charts

Personnel
John Woloschuk - lead vocals, backing vocals, piano, organ, synthesizer, bass guitar
Dee Long - backing vocals, mellotron, synthesizer, electric guitar
Terry Draper - lead vocals, backing vocals, drums, tympani, percussion
Terry Brown - backing vocals

Carpenters version

The Carpenters' version from their Passage album charted worldwide and appeared on several of their hits compilations. The song title appears on the Carpenters' version above the tagline "(The Recognized Anthem Of World Contact Day)". The success of their version led to the duo receiving many letters from people asking when World Contact Day would be held. The song ultimately led to a successful Carpenters television special, The Carpenters...Space Encounters.

While Klaatu's original opens with various sounds of living species, the Carpenters' version opens with a radio DJ on a request show. The DJ identifies a phone caller as "Mike Ledgerwood". When the DJ asks Mike for his song request, an alien-sounding voice responds. The DJ is voiced by longstanding Carpenters' guitarist Tony Peluso, who can be seen in that role at the start of the video for the track.

The vocal melody ranges from B♭3 to G♭5.

The Carpenters' arrangement of the song was later copied on a sound-alike cover released on the 1977 album Top of the Pops, Volume 62.

The cover art was painted by designer Andrew Probert.

Reaching number nine in the UK Singles Chart in 1977, in a UK television special on ITV in  2016 it was voted fifth in The Nation's Favourite Carpenters Song.

Chart

Weekly Charts

Year-end charts

Music videos
The Carpenters had two music videos for "Calling Occupants of Interplanetary Craft":
Starparade – German TV, 1977; available on their DVD Gold: Greatest Hits
Space Encounters – Carpenters' TV special, 1978; available on their DVD Interpretations

Personnel
Karen Carpenter - lead and backing vocals
Richard Carpenter - lead and backing vocals, piano, Hammond organ, Fender Rhodes electric piano, ARP Odyssey, orchestration
Joe Osborn - bass
Tony Peluso - electric guitar, DJ
Ron Tutt - drums
Earle Dumler - oboe
Gregg Smith Singers - backing vocals
Peter Knight - orchestral arrangement
Uncredited - percussion

References
Notes

References

1976 songs
1977 singles
Klaatu (band) songs
The Carpenters songs
Irish Singles Chart number-one singles
Songs about extraterrestrial life
A&M Records singles
Capitol Records singles
Rock ballads
1970s ballads
Pop ballads